Leon Russell is the debut solo album by the singer, songwriter, and multi-instrumentalist Leon Russell. It followed his debut with the Midnight String Quartet and a production by Russell and Marc Benno billed as the Asylum Choir.

"A Song for You", written by Russell for this album, is a slow, pained plea for forgiveness and understanding from an estranged lover. The tune is one of Russell's best-known compositions. It has been performed and recorded by over 200 artists, spanning many musical genres. Elton John has called the song an American classic.

On January 17, 2018, "A Song for You" was added to Grammy Hall of Fame.

Track listing
All tracks composed by Leon Russell except where indicated

Side One
"A Song for You" – 4:08
"Dixie Lullaby" (Russell, Chris Stainton) – 2:30
"I Put a Spell on You" – 4:10
"Shoot Out on the Plantation" – 3:10
"Hummingbird" – 3:57
Side Two
"Delta Lady" – 4:00
"Prince of Peace" (Russell, Greg Dempsey) – 3:05
"Masters of War (Bob Dylan) - 1:20
"Give Peace a Chance" (Russell, Bonnie Bramlett) – 2:15
"Hurtsome Body" – 3:35
"Pisces Apple Lady" – 2:50
"Roll Away the Stone" (Russell, Greg Dempsey) – 3:06

The 1993 "GOLD DISC" CD re-issue contains the following bonus tracks:
"The New Sweet Home Chicago" (Russell, Marc Benno) – 3:11
"Jammin' with Eric" (Russell, Eric Clapton) – 4:14
"Indian Girl" – 4:08
"Shoot Out on the Plantation" (solo piano version) – 3:31
"(Can't Seem To) Get a Line on You" (Mick Jagger, Keith Richards) – 4:16

"Roll Away the Stone", "Pisces Apple Lady", "Hurtsome Body", "Prince of Peace", "Delta Lady", "Shoot Out On the Plantation" and "I Put a Spell On You" - Recorded at Olympic Sound, London, September 1969
"Hummingbird" - Recorded at Wally Heider Recording, Los Angeles, December 29, 1969
"Dixie Lullaby" - Recorded at Gold Star Studios, Los Angeles, December 22, 1969
"Give Peace a Chance" - Recorded at Ardent Recording, Memphis, November 1969
"A Song for You" - Recorded at Sunset Sound, Los Angeles, January 1970
Final Mixes by Glyn Johns made at Sunset Sound, Los Angeles, January 17-19, 1970

Charts

Personnel
Leon Russell – piano, guitar, bass, vocals
George Harrison – guitar
Eric Clapton – guitar 
Delaney Bramlett – guitar
Alan Spenner – bass guitar
Klaus Voormann – bass guitar 
Bill Wyman – bass guitar  
Steve Winwood – keyboards 
Chris Stainton – keyboards  
Ringo Starr - drums 
Charlie Watts – drums 
Buddy Harman – drums
Jim Gordon – drums
B.J. Wilson – drums  
Jon Hiseman – drums 
Mick Jagger – vocals 
Bonnie Bramlett – vocals
Joe Cocker – vocals
Merry Clayton – vocals
Jim Horn – saxophone

Technical
 Leon Russell – producer
 Denny Cordell – producer
Glyn Johns – engineer, mixing
Tom Wilkes – design
Jim McCrary – photography
"This album is dedicated to: Chris Stainton / George Harrison / Ringo Starr / Charlie Watts / Bill Wyman / Eric Clapton / Klaus Voorman / BJ Wilson / Alan Spenner / Jim Gordon / Greg Dempsey / Stevie Winwood / Jim Horn / Mr. & Mrs. Bramlett / Bobby Whiplash / Clydie King / Merry Clayton & Joe Cocker, for their inspirational music."

External links
Official Leon Russell website
Leon Russell discography
Leon Russell lyrics
Leon Russell Records
Leon Russell NAMM Oral History Program Interview (2012)

References

Leon Russell albums
1970 debut albums
Shelter Records albums
A&M Records albums
albums produced by Denny Cordell
Albums produced by Leon Russell
Albums recorded at Sunset Sound Recorders
Albums recorded at Wally Heider Studios
Albums recorded at Gold Star Studios
albums recorded at Olympic Sound Studios